The 2021 UEFA Super Cup was the 46th edition of the UEFA Super Cup, an annual football match organised by UEFA and contested by the winners of the two main European club competitions, the UEFA Champions League and the UEFA Europa League. The match featured English club Chelsea, the winners of the 2020–21 UEFA Champions League, and Spanish club Villarreal, the winners of the 2020–21 UEFA Europa League. It was played at Windsor Park, Belfast, Northern Ireland, on 11 August 2021.

Chelsea won the match 6–5 on penalties following a 1–1 draw after extra time for their second UEFA Super Cup title.

Teams

Venue

The match was the first UEFA club competition final to be played in Northern Ireland. The 18,500-capacity Windsor Park is the home of Linfield and the Northern Ireland national team. Opened in 1905, the stadium was most recently renovated from 2014 to 2016 with aid from UEFA's HatTrick assistance programme. The venue previously hosted the finals of the 2005 UEFA European Under-19 Championship and 2017 UEFA Women's Under-19 Championship.

Host selection
An open bidding process was launched on 28 September 2018 by UEFA to select the venues of the finals of the UEFA Champions League, UEFA Europa League, and UEFA Women's Champions League in 2021. Associations had until 26 October 2018 to express interest, and bid dossiers must be submitted by 15 February 2019.

UEFA announced on 1 November 2018 that four associations had expressed interest in hosting the 2021 UEFA Super Cup, and on 22 February 2019 that all four associations submitted their dossiers by the deadline.

Windsor Park was selected by the UEFA Executive Committee during their meeting in Ljubljana, Slovenia on 24 September 2019.

Pre-match

Officials
On 6 August 2021, UEFA named Russian official Sergei Karasev as the referee for the match. Karasev had been a FIFA referee since 2010, and officiated at UEFA Euro 2016, the 2018 FIFA World Cup and UEFA Euro 2020. He was joined by fellow countrymen Igor Demeshko and Maksim Gavrilin as assistant referees, while Aleksei Kulbakov of Belarus served as the fourth official. Marco Fritz of Germany was selected as the video assistant referee (VAR), with Paweł Gil of Poland and Massimiliano Irrati of Italy serving as the assistant VAR officials. Irrati's countryman Filippo Meli was selected as the reserve assistant referee.

Match

Summary
Chelsea opened the scoring after 27 minutes when Kai Havertz's low cross from the left was swept into the net by Hakim Ziyech from seven yards out. Ziyech was substituted after a shoulder injury just before half-time. Alberto Moreno hit a volley off the underside of the crossbar in first-half injury time. Villarreal equalised in the 73rd minute when Gerard Moreno scored with a clinical right-foot finish to the top left corner of the net after a flick-back from Boulaye Dia on the right of the penalty area.
The match went to extra-time with Chelsea goalkeeper Édouard Mendy being replaced in the last minute by Kepa Arrizabalaga. Arrizabalaga saved two penalties, the decisive one low to his right from Raúl Albiol allowed Chelsea to win 6–5 in the shoot-out.

Details
The Champions League winners were designated as the "home" team for administrative purposes.

Statistics

See also
2021 UEFA Champions League Final
2021 UEFA Europa League Final
2021 UEFA Women's Champions League Final
Chelsea F.C. in international football
Villarreal CF in European football

References

Notes

External links

2021
Super Cup
2021–22 in English football
2021–22 in Spanish football
Chelsea F.C. matches
Villarreal CF matches
August 2021 sports events in the United Kingdom
International association football competitions hosted by Northern Ireland
Sports competitions in Belfast
2021–22 in Northern Ireland association football
UEFA Super Cup 2021